The district courts of appeal (DCAs) are the intermediate appellate courts of the Florida state court system. There are currently six DCAs:
The First District Court of Appeal is headquartered in Tallahassee
The Second District Court of Appeal is headquartered in Lakeland and has a branch in Tampa
The Third District Court of Appeal is headquartered in Miami
The Fourth District Court of Appeal is headquartered in West Palm Beach
The Fifth District Court of Appeal is headquartered in Daytona Beach
The Sixth District Court of Appeal is headquartered in Lakeland

History
The district courts of appeal were created by the Florida Legislature in 1957 to provide an intermediate level of appellate review between the trial courts (the county courts and circuit courts) and the Florida Supreme Court. This was done, as in other parts of the United States, to relieve the state supreme court of the pressure of its ever-increasing appellate docket; the lobbying effort by Florida Supreme Court Justice Elwyn Thomas played a large role in the DCAs' creation. 

Three DCAs were initially created, with the Third District Court of Appeal was given jurisdiction over cases arising from Dade and Monroe counties. Later, the Fourth, Fifth and Sixth District Courts of Appeal were created.

The existence of the DCAs was provided for in the Florida Constitution, which now requires the legislature to divide the state into appellate court districts, providing each with a DCA.

At the time, Florida was the second state to have district courts of appeal, as California had created its own district courts of appeal in 1904. However, in 1966, California dropped the word "district" from the names of the California Courts of Appeal, thus leaving Florida as the sole state with DCAs.

The DCAs were originally intended to serve as the final appellate courts for the vast majority of cases.  During the 1960s, the Florida Supreme Court decided several cases which had the cumulative effect of turning the DCAs into non-final "way-stations in the appellate process."  Chief Justice Arthur J. England Jr. played a major role in bringing about the 1980 constitutional amendment which effectively overruled those cases and again narrowed the state supreme court's jurisdiction "to resolve its uncontrollable caseload."

Judges
District court of appeal judges, like Florida Supreme Court justices, are first recommended by the Florida Judicial Nominating Commission. They are then appointed by the governor of Florida, but have retention elections every six years, in which voters are asked on the ballot to vote whether the judge should be retained in office.

DCAs have different numbers of judges – currently ranging from 11 to 15 - based on the docket size.

Jurisdiction
The jurisdiction of the DCAs is set forth in Florida Rule of Appellate Procedure 9.030.

Appeals are usually heard by a three-judge panel.  Occasionally a DCA will hold an en banc hearing, in which all the judges participate.

The decisions of the district courts of appeal represent the law of Florida unless and until they are overruled by the Florida Supreme Court. Stanfill v. State, 384 So.2d 141, 143 (Fla. 1980). Thus, in the absence of interdistrict conflict, district court decisions bind all Florida trial courts. Weiman v. McHaffie, 470 So.2d 682, 684 (Fla. 1985).See Pardo v. State, 596 So. 2d 665 (Fla. 1992).  In the event of a conflict between the decisions of different district courts of appeal, county and circuit courts must adhere to the case law of their own district court of appeal.  

District courts of appeal may recede from certain case law and precedent in subsequent decisions, or the Supreme Court may override a district court's precedent in favor of conflicting case law from another district.  Because the Florida Supreme Court has predominantly discretionary jurisdiction (i.e., can choose which cases it wants to hear), the DCAs provide the final word on the vast majority of cases appealed in the State of Florida. Cases that are affirmed without comment by the district courts cannot be appealed to the Supreme Court, even as a request for discretionary review.  Such a case may be reviewed by the United States Supreme Court pursuant to a petition for writ of certiorari. 

Cases involving the death penalty are heard directly and automatically by the Florida Supreme Court, bypassing the district courts of appeal.

See also
 Judiciary of Florida

References

External links
Website of the Florida District Courts of Appeal
Florida First District Court of Appeal Website
Florida Second District Court of Appeal Website
Florida Third District Court of Appeal Website
Florida Fourth District Court of Appeal Website
Florida Fifth District Court of Appeal Website
Florida Sixth District Court of Appeal Webpage
Florida Rules of Appellate Procedure

Florida appellate courts
State appellate courts of the United States
1957 establishments in Florida
Courts and tribunals established in 1957